Edaphobacillus  is a Gram-positive, aerobic, non-spore-forming and non-motile genus of bacteria from the family of Bacillaceae with one known species (Edaphobacillus lindanitolerans).

References

Bacillaceae
Bacteria genera
Monotypic bacteria genera